The 2010 Polsat Warsaw Open was a women's tennis tournament played on outdoor clay courts. It was the 14th edition of the Warsaw Tournament, and was part of the Premier-level tournaments of the 2010 WTA Tour. It took place at the Legia Tennis Centre in Warsaw, Poland, from May 17–23, 2009. Alexandra Dulgheru won the singles title.

Finals

Singles

 Alexandra Dulgheru defeated  Zheng Jie, 6–3, 6–4

Doubles

 Virginia Ruano Pascual /  Meghann Shaughnessy defeated  Cara Black /  Yan Zi, 6–3, 6–4

Entrants

Seeds

 Seedings are based on the rankings of May 10, 2010.

Other entrants
The following players received wildcards into the main draw:
  Marta Domachowska
  Katarzyna Piter

The following players received entry from the qualifying draw:
  Gréta Arn
  Irina-Camelia Begu
  Bojana Jovanovski
  Tsvetana Pironkova

The following player received the lucky loser spot:
  Andreja Klepač

External links
Official website

Polsat Warsaw Open
Warsaw Open
War